"The Circle Game" is a song by Canadian singer-songwriter Joni Mitchell composed in 1966. One of her most-covered songs, it was originally recorded by Ian & Sylvia and Buffy Sainte-Marie in 1967, and by Tom Rush for his 1968 album of the same name. Mitchell recorded it for her 1970 album Ladies of the Canyon, it also appears on her album Miles of Aisles.

Background

Mitchell has said that "The Circle Game" was written as a response to the song "Sugar Mountain" by Neil Young, whom she had befriended on the Canadian folk-music circuit in the mid-1960s. Young wrote "Sugar Mountain" in 1964 on his 19th birthday, lamenting the end of his teenage years: "You can't be 20 on Sugar Mountain." "The Circle Game" offers a more hopeful conclusion: "So the years spin by and now the boy is twenty / Though his dreams have lost some grandeur coming true / There'll be new dreams, maybe better dreams and plenty / Before the last revolving year is through."

In a concert at the Paris Theatre in London on October 29, 1970, Mitchell opened her performance of "The Circle Game" with this speech:

Mitchell: "In 1965 I was up in Canada, and there was a friend of mine up there who had just left a rock'n'roll band (...) he had just newly turned 21, and that meant he was no longer allowed into his favourite haunt, which was kind of a teeny-bopper club and once you're over 21 you couldn't get back in there anymore; so he was really feeling terrible because his girlfriends and everybody that he wanted to hang out with, his band could still go there, you know, but it's one of the things that drove him to become a folk singer was that he couldn't play in this club anymore. 'Cause he was over the hill. (...) So he wrote this song that was called "Oh to live on sugar mountain" which was a lament for his lost youth. (...) And I thought, God, you know, if we get to 21 and there's nothing after that, that's a pretty bleak future, so I wrote a song for him, and for myself just to give me some hope. It's called 'The Circle Game.'"

Mitchell composed the song in 1966. That year, Mitchell performed songs at a Detroit nightclub where Tom Rush was headlining. Rush asked Mitchell to put some songs on tape for him, and she put "The Circle Game" at the end of the tape. Rush was quoted as saying, "As long as kids grow up, that tune will be relevant."

Before Rush could release the song, it was recorded in 1967 by Ian & Sylvia for their album So Much for Dreaming and by Buffy Sainte-Marie for her album Fire & Fleet & Candlelight. Rush recorded the song as the title track of his 1968 album The Circle Game, which also featured the Mitchell compositions "Tin Angel" and "Urge for Going."

Mitchell recorded the song for her 1970 album Ladies of the Canyon, with backing vocals by Crosby, Stills & Nash credited under the pseudonym "The Lookout Mountain United Downstairs Choir."

Buffy Sainte-Marie version

When Buffy Sainte-Marie recorded "The Circle Game" in 1967 for her album Fire & Fleet & Candlelight, it was also released as a single (with "Until It's Time For You To Go" as the B-side) but did not chart. Sainte-Marie's version was later featured on the soundtrack to the 1970 album The Strawberry Statement and was reissued as a single. The 1970 reissue reached No. 109 on the Billboard singles chart.

Sainte-Marie's version of "The Circle Game" is featured in Quentin Tarantino's 2019 film Once Upon a Time in Hollywood, in the scene where Sharon Tate (Margot Robbie) is driving on an L.A. freeway. It also appears on the film's soundtrack.

Other cover versions
Mitchell's song has been covered by many other artists over the decades, including George Hamilton IV (1968), Harry Belafonte (1971), Agnes Chan (1971), Ian McCulloch (1989), and Tori Amos (2005).

Legacy

The song inspired David Clayton-Thomas when he was writing the Blood, Sweat & Tears 1968 hit "Spinning Wheel." The line "The painted ponies go up and down" gave him the idea to write "Ride a painted pony let the spinnin' wheel spin."

References 

1967 songs
1967 singles
1970 singles
Songs written by Joni Mitchell
Joni Mitchell songs
Song recordings produced by Joni Mitchell
Buffy Sainte-Marie songs
Vanguard Records singles
Songs about children
Songs about old age
Songs about teenagers